Achroia is a genus of small moths of the snout moth family (Pyralidae). It belongs to the tribe Galleriini of subfamily Galleriinae.

It has only one unequivocally recognized species:

 Achroia grisella (Fabricius, 1794) – lesser wax moth

Others are mentioned here with doubtful validity:

 Achroia aluearia Fabricius 1798
 Achroia alvea Haworth 1811
 Achroia anticella Walker 1863
 Achroia cinereola Hübner 1802
 Achroia ifranella Lucas 1955
 Achroia innotata (Walker, 1864)
 Achroia obscurevittella Ragonot 1901

Invalid junior synonyms of this genus are:
 Achroea Agassiz, 1847 (unjustified emendation)
 Acroia (lapsus)
 Meliphora Guenée, 1845
 Vobrix Walker, 1864

Footnotes

References
  (2004): Butterflies and Moths of the World, Generic Names and their Type-species – Achroia. Version of November 5, 2004. Retrieved May 29, 2011.
  (2010): Markku Savela's Lepidoptera and Some Other Life Forms – Achroia. Version of July 2, 2010. Retrieved May 29, 2011.

Galleriini
Pyralidae genera
Taxa named by Jacob Hübner